Hininy,() is traditional food in Saudi Arabia especially in Najd. It is usually prepared in winter. It is made from dates, brown bread, ghee, cardamom and saffron.

References 

Arab cuisine
Saudi Arabian cuisine